Crinocula is a monotypic moth genus of the family Noctuidae erected by Karl Jordan in 1896. Its only species, Crinocula kinabaluensis, was first described by Walter Rothschild in 1896. It is found in Borneo.

References

Agaristinae
Monotypic moth genera